Dunfermline railway station can refer to one of several railway stations in the town of Dunfermline, Scotland:

Those with Dunfermline in the station name 
 Dunfermline City railway station, on the Dunfermline and Queensferry Railway, previously called Dunfermline Lower & Dunfermline Town
 , where the Stirling and Dunfermline Railway and Dunfermline Branch of Edinburgh and Northern Railway met (closed)
 , opened in 2000.

Those nearby 
 Charlestown, (closed)
 
 , (closed)
 Netherton Goods

Notes
 Remove Charlestown link, incorrect link